Twenty One is an album by pianist Geri Allen with bassist Ron Carter and drummer Tony Williams recorded in 1994 and released on the Blue Note label. The title of the album refers to the commitment Allen made at age 21 to continue and extend the tradition of the jazz masters.

Reception 

AllMusic awarded the album 3½ stars, stating, " Allen's style is fairly original, with hints of Herbie Nichols, and her chancetaking but logical solos are generally quite stimulating".

Writer Gary Giddins called the album "a display of strength" and "a mature work by a performer... who was repositioning herself as a jazz centrist." He commented: "This is a trio fearsomely alive... The triumph of Twenty One is in the certainty with which Allen's individuality asserts itself in a setting that might have neutralized her."

Track listing 
All compositions by Geri Allen except as indicated
 "RTG" - 2:46
 "If I Should Lose You" (Ralph Rainger, Leo Robin) - 4:36
 "Drummer's Song" - 3:52
 "Introspection/Thelonious" (Thelonious Monk) - 4:36
 "A Beautiful Friendship" (Donald Kahn, Stanley Styne) - 3:23
 "In the Morning" - 6:10
 "Tea for Two" (Irving Caesar, Vincent Youmans) - 3:18
 "Lullaby of the Leaves" (Bernice Petkere, Joe Young) - 5:15
 "Feed the Fire" - 6:17
 "Old Folks" (Dedette Lee Hill, Willard Robison) - 6:18	
 "A Place of Power" - 3:16	
 "In the Middle" - 4:25

Personnel 
 Geri Allen - piano
 Ron Carter - bass 
 Tony Williams - drums

References 

1994 albums
Geri Allen albums
Blue Note Records albums
Albums produced by Teo Macero
Instrumental albums